Uncle John's Bathroom Readers are a series of books containing trivia and short essays on miscellaneous topics, ostensibly for reading in the bathroom. The books are credited to the Bathroom Readers' Institute, though Uncle John is a real person named John Javna, who created the series along with his brother Gordon, as well as a team of assistants. 
 

The books are published by Portable Press, an imprint of Printer's Row Publishing Group. The introductions in the books, as well as brief notes in some articles, provide small pieces of information about Uncle John. The first book was published in 1988, and in 2012, the series reached its 25th release, The Fully Loaded 25th Anniversary Bathroom Reader.

Volumes dedicated to a single topic have been released, under the title Uncle John Plunges Into..., for example: history, presidents, and the universe. There are also books on individual U.S. states, the weather, numbers, quotes, the year 2000, a special book for mothers, cat lovers, dog lovers, horse lovers, love, Uncle John's Book of the Dumb, and several Bathroom Readers for Kids Only!. Though most of the books were written by the Bathroom Readers' Institute, some of the ones that are based around a specific subject are written by a lone author, who is not in the Institute. Additionally, the Institute will often publish articles and other contributions sent in from readers. Recurring articles such as "Flubbed Headlines", "Oops", and "Classifieds" often depend on these contributions. Currently, the institute publishes three books a year; a "classic" reader, and two "plunges into" editions, one for a location such as a U.S. state, and another of a specific topic.

Their volumes contain information on subjects such as quotes, dumb criminals, palindromes, anagrams, urban legends and hoaxes, failed inventions, the history of everyday things, and accidental discoveries, as well as articles on pop culture and 'celebrities' such as Emperor Norton (see Features). Throughout the books, there are what the BRI calls "running feet"—short fun facts on the bottom of each page. A typical example is "An object on Jupiter would weigh 144,000 times more than it would on Pluto." Some books have one running foot that simply says "Hi, mom."

Uncle John's also publishes Page-a-Day calendars with Workman Publishing Company.

The series has sold 15 million copies.

Features 
Among the regular articles in the books are:

 Origins of Words and Phrases- the "Familiar Phrases" feature, though having changed names several times throughout the series, has been featured in some form in 16 of the "Classic" books. It is often seen many times in each book, usually three or four times. The "Word Origins" has also had its name changed over the years, and has been seen in every book of the series since its introduction in Uncle John's Second Bathroom Reader
 Rumors and Urban Legends The "Rumors" article was first seen in the very first book, but has been replaced, starting with the 10th Anniversary Reader with the similar, and very popular "Urban Legends" section.
 Famous for 15 Minutes- Also originating in the series' first book, "Famous for 15 Minutes" is based on Andy Warhol's famous quote that everybody will someday be famous for a short period. The feature describes the stories of those who fit this description, often in a style reminiscent of the Darwin Awards (i.e., those mentioned often act in a very unbecoming fashion). Also very popular, it has been seen in 15 Bathroom Readers.
 Strange Lawsuits: Bizarre, actual lawsuits. For example, a woman sues Bill Clinton because aliens have told her that he will enslave all black women.
 Oops! First seen in Uncle John's Sixth Bathroom Reader, "Oops!" is a set of newspaper article excerpts describing humorous mistakes in the previous year.
 Q&A: Ask the Experts: Considerably more popular in the Kids Bathroom Reader series, "Ask the Experts" answers questions (e.g. "Do fish drown?"). It was first seen in the 6th Bathroom Reader.
 Court Transquips Originally called "Disorder in the Court," the feature was introduced in the 5th Bathroom Reader, and pokes fun at things said in court cases (such as 'Were you alone or by yourself?' 'Was that the same nose you broke as a child?'), and unintentionally-humorous exchanges between judges and lawyers, defendants or witnesses ('You've been accused of stealing 15 chickens.  Are you the defendant?' 'No, sir, I'm the guy that stole the chickens.').
 They Went That-a-Way Accounts of unusual deaths, typically of celebrities—for example, the ironic passing of Redd Foxx. This first appears in the 2nd bathroom reader under epitaphs.
 Uncle John's Stall of Fame- Accounts of bathrooms and toilets being used in a positive way.
 Uncle John's Stall of Shame -- Accounts of bathrooms and toilets being used in a negative way.

History

1988–1991 
The Bathroom Readers' Institute began in 1988, with the publishing of the original Uncle John's Bathroom Reader, by St. Martin's Press Publishers. After the book's success, Uncle John's 2nd Bathroom Reader was published in 1989, with a third and a fourth book being added to the series in the subsequent years. These earlier books are distinct from the rest not only because of their short length, but because of the writing style: Short articles starting with a brief history of the subject, followed by several tidbits on the subject.

1992–1995 
After the initial four books, the BRI decided that it would publish further volumes under its own label, and Uncle John's 5th Bathroom Reader was released in October 1992; notable for a revised writing style, more and longer articles, and the introduction of new recurring features, Uncle John's 5th set what would become the standard design for every book going forward.  The Fifth, Sixth and Seventh Bathroom Reader went out of print in 1994, and would later be re-released as a single volume, Uncle John's Legendary Lost Bathroom Reader. In 1995, the millionth copy of the series was sold, and to celebrate the milestone, the BRI released an eighth volume, The Best of Uncle John's Bathroom Reader.

1996–2002 
In 1996, the Bathroom Readers' Institute revised its writing style yet again, adopting a more 'encyclopedic' style, as well as spreading longer articles throughout the book. In 2000, John Javna retired from the Bathroom Reader series to care for his elderly parents, and the series was run thereafter by his brother Gordon, who had co-created the series with him.

2003–present 
For the first 15 years, "Bathroom Readers" referred to just one series. Now, there were several competitors (none quite as successful) and quite a few series within the BRI. Books 15–18 began to move away from the format seen in previous books, using two- and three-part articles, and sometimes removing popular recurring features in favor of the longer format. For a time, the Bathroom Reader series was owned by Advanced Marketing Services, a discount books distributor that went bankrupt in 2007, after which it was sold to a new owner with Gordon Javna continuing to steward the series until 2016.

In 2012, Uncle John's Bathroom Reader celebrated its 25th anniversary with the publication of "Fully Loaded 25th Anniversary Bathroom Reader". With the 28th edition of the series, the cover was completely overhauled, with a new flexibound cover instead of the old paper. With the 30th anniversary of the series in 2017, the books were updated to feature a new interior design. The flexibound covers were discontinued with the 35th anniversary in 2022.

Gordon Javna retired from the series in 2016 after the Bathroom Reader offices in Ashland, Oregon were closed. The series continued to be published by Portable Press, and the Javna brothers were described by Bookriot as not being directly involved with the publication of the Bathroom Reader books as of 2022. John Javna has continued to write the introductions for subsequent volumes of the series, and he and Gordon are also listed as contributors to recent editions.

List of Uncle John's Books

List of Omnibuses

Plunges Into... 
Besides the annual editions and omnibuses, many topic specific editions were also published.  These editions focused on such things like individual U.S. states, history, national parks, Hollywood, television, the U.S. Armed Forces, the environment, etc. These have ceased publishing since 2013.
 Uncle John's Plunges into History 2001
 Uncle John's Plunges into National Parks, First Printing 2007
 Uncle John's Plunges into Great Lives, First Printing 
 Uncle John's Plunges into Canada
 Uncle John's Plunges into the Universe
 Uncle John's Plunges into New Jersey
 Uncle John's Plunges into Minnesota
 Uncle John's Plunges into California
 Uncle John's Plunges into Texas
 Uncle John's Plunges into New York

Other Titles
 Uncle John’s Bathroom Reader Shoots and Scores
 Uncle John’s Bathroom Reader Shoots and Scores, Updated & Expanded 
 Uncle John Takes a Swing at Baseball
 Uncle Johns Strange & Scarey (kids)
 Uncle Johns Book of the Dumb
 Uncle John's Quintessential Collection of Quotable Non Quotables
 Uncle John's Briefs: Quick Bits of Fascinating Facts and Amazing Trivia
 Uncle John's New & Improved Briefs: Fast Facts, Terse Trivia & Astute Articles

References

External links
 Bathroom Readers' Institute
 Bathroom Readers' Institute calendars
Series of books
Trivia books